Sigmoria rubromarginata is a species of flat-backed millipede in the family Xystodesmidae. It is found in North America.

References

Further reading

 

Polydesmida
Articles created by Qbugbot
Animals described in 1888